The 1976-1977 FIRA Trophy was the 17th edition of a European rugby union championship for national teams.

The tournament was won by Romania, with a Grand Slam, which included a 15-12 win over France and a 69-0 trashing of Italy.

First division 
Table

Morocco were relegated to division 2 for the worst points difference.

Results

Second Division 

Table

Czechoslovakia promoted in Division 1; Netherlands disqualified for no-show

Results

Third Division 
Table

Results

Bibliography 
 Francesco Volpe, Valerio Vecchiarelli (2000), 2000 Italia in Meta, Storia della nazionale italiana di rugby dagli albori al Sei Nazioni, GS Editore (2000) .
 Francesco Volpe, Paolo Pacitti (Author), Rugby 2000, GTE Gruppo Editorale (1999).

References

External links
 FIRA-AER official website

1976–77 in European rugby union
1976–77
1977 rugby union tournaments for national teams
1976 rugby union tournaments for national teams